In enzymology, a 6-methylsalicylic-acid synthase is a polyketide synthase that catalyzes the chemical reaction

acetyl-CoA + 3 malonyl-CoA + NADPH + H+  6-methylsalicylate + 4 CoA + 3 CO2 + NADP+ + H2O

The 4 substrates of this enzyme are acetyl-CoA, malonyl-CoA, NADPH, and H+, whereas its 5 products are 6-methylsalicylate, CoA, CO2, NADP+, and H2O.

This enzyme belongs to the family of transferases, specifically those acyltransferases transferring groups other than aminoacyl groups.  The systematic name of this enzyme class is acyl-CoA:malonyl-CoA C-acyltransferase (decarboxylating, oxoacyl-reducing, thioester-hydrolysing and cyclizing). Other names in common use include MSAS, and 6-methylsalicylic acid synthase.

References

 
 
 

EC 2.3.1
NADPH-dependent enzymes
Enzymes of unknown structure